Mueang Sakon Nakhon is the capital district (amphoe mueang) of Sakon Nakhon province, Thailand.

Geography
Neighboring districts are (from the north clockwise): Na Wa of Nakhon Phanom province, and Kusuman, Phon Na Kaeo, Khok Si Suphan, Tao Ngoi, Phu Phan, Kut Bak, and Phanna Nikhom of Sakon Nakhon Province.

To the northeast of the district is the Nong Han Lake, the largest natural lake of northeast Thailand.

Within the township of Tha Rae is the center of the Roman Catholic Archdiocese of Thare and Nonseng.

Administration 
The district is divided into 16 sub-districts (tambons), which are further subdivided into 169 villages (mubans). The city (thesaban nakhon) Sakon Nakhon covers tambon of That Choeng Chum and parts of tambons Ngio Don, Huai Yang, Dong Mafai, That Na Weng, and Hang Hong. There are a further two townships (thesaban tambons). Dong Mafai covers parts of tambon Khamin, and Tha Rae covers parts of the same-named tambon. There are a further 15 tambon administrative organizations (TAO).

Missing numbers belong to four tambons which now form Phon Na Kaeo District, and tambon Kok Pla Sio which is now in Phu Phan District.

References

Mueang Sakon Nakhon